Washington is a city in Daviess County, Indiana.  The population was 11,509 at the time of the 2010 census. The city is the county seat of Daviess County. It is also the principal city of the Washington, Indiana Micropolitan Statistical Area, which comprises all of Daviess County and had an estimated 2017 population of 31,648.

History
Washington was platted in 1815. It was named from Washington Township.

The railroad was built through Washington in 1857. By 1889, it was a major depot and repair yard for the Ohio and Mississippi Railroad. The Baltimore and Ohio Railroad took over the line in 1893. During this time, the railroad employed over 1,000 workers.

On November 17, 2013, an EF2 tornado tore through the western edge of the city destroying 20 homes and severely damaging 20 others.

The Magnus J. Carnahan House, Daviess County Courthouse, Thomas Faith House, Robert C. Graham House, Dr. John A. Scudder House, Washington Commercial Historic District, and Dr. Nelson Wilson House are listed on the National Register of Historic Places.

Geography
Washington is located at  (38.658207, -87.175111).

Climate
Washington has a humid subtropical climate (Köppen classification Cfa), with four distinct seasons. Winters are cool to chilly with moderate snowfall, while summers are warm and humid.

Demographics

2010 census
As of the census of 2010, there were 11,509 people, 4,558 households, and 2,849 families living in the city. The racial makeup of the city was 89.2% White, 1.1% African American, 0.3% Native American, 1.1% Asian, 0.1% Pacific Islander, 6.4% from other races, and 1.9% from two or more races. Hispanic or Latino of any race were 9.6% of the population.

There were 4,558 households, of which 33.4% had children under the age of 18 living with them, 41.8% were married couples living together, 15.2% had a female householder with no husband present, 5.5% had a male householder with no wife present, and 37.5% were non-families. 31.8% of all households were made up of individuals, and 14.9% had someone living alone who was 65 years of age or older. The average household size was 2.43 and the average family size was 3.04.

The median age in the city was 37.3 years. 25.5% of residents were under the age of 18; 9.4% were between the ages of 18 and 24; 24% were from 25 to 44; 25.2% were from 45 to 64; and 15.9% were 65 years of age or older. The gender makeup of the city was 48.2% male and 51.8% female.

2000 census
As of the census of 2000, there were 11,380 people, 4,658 households, and 2,897 families living in the city. The racial makeup of the city was 95.30% White, 0.91% African American, 0.30% Native American, 0.39% Asian, 0.05% Pacific Islander, 2.20% from other races, and 0.85% from two or more races. Hispanic or Latino of any race were 4.15% of the population.

There were 4,658 households, out of which 30.6% had children under the age of 18 living with them, 45.9% were married couples living together, 12.5% had a female householder with no husband present, and 37.8% were non-families. 33.2% of all households were made up of individuals, and 16.1% had someone living alone who was 65 years of age or older. The average household size was 2.36 and the average family size was 2.99.

In the city, the population was spread out, with 25.5% under the age of 18, 8.3% from 18 to 24, 26.1% from 25 to 44, 21.7% from 45 to 64, and 18.3% who were 65 years of age or older. The median age was 38 years. For every 100 females, there were 89.7 males. For every 100 females age 18 and over, there were 84.7 males.

The median income for a household in the city was $29,055, and the median income for a family was $37,713. Males had a median income of $30,570 versus $19,306 for females. The per capita income for the city was $16,721. About 9.8% of families and 14.3% of the population were below the poverty line, including 19.3% of those under age 18 and 10.4% of those age 65 or over.

Transportation

Highways
  - Interstate 69 bypasses the city to the east.
  /  - US 50 and US 150 Bypass the city to the south.
  - SR 57 runs through downtown and runs north to Plainville, and south to Petersburg
  - SR 257 begins southeast of the city at the US 50/150 Bypass, and runs south to Otwell

Education
The town has a free lending library, the Washington Carnegie Public Library.

Washington Community Schools include:
Washington High School
Washington Junior High School
Helen Griffith Elementary
Lena Dunn Elementary
North Elementary School
Veale Elementary School

Arts and culture
Washington still retains a number of architecturally historical buildings. The Helphenstine House, built in 1847, displays Greek Revival architecture styles. The Robert C. Graham House was owned by an Indiana car manufacturer and was built in 1912. It is an example of Frank Lloyd Wright's Prairie School of Architecture and is listed on the National Register of Historic Places. It has marble fireplaces, crystal-glass French windows, a billiards room and parquet floors. On Main Street of Washington is the Daviess County Historical Society Museum, a collection of history related to Daviess County and Indiana. The museum features a funeral practices exhibit, a military history room, an art gallery, a Civil War display with an 1855 slave collar and a Civil War era regimental flag, a school room, and an archives room for genealogists as well as a gift shop.

The Washington Browns was a minor league baseball team in Washington that played in the Class C Central League in 1897 and were immediately preceded by the Washington Giants, who were members of the Independent level 1896 Kentucky-Indiana League.

Notable people
 Eric Bassler, member of the Indiana Senate
Charles "Bud" Dant, musician
 David "Big Dave" DeJernett, basketball player
 Don C. Faith, Jr., United States Army officer
 Esther G. Frame (1840-1920), Quaker minister and evangelist
 Chuck Harmon, baseball player
 Anthony R. Jones, United States Army lieutenant general
 Leo Klier, basketball player
 Patrick Summers, conductor
 Charles Thorn, string theorist
 Cody Zeller, basketball player
 Luke Zeller, basketball player
 Tyler Zeller, basketball player

References

External links

 City of Washington, Indiana Website
 Washington Times Herald Website
 
 

 
Cities in Indiana
Communities of Southwestern Indiana
Cities in Daviess County, Indiana
Micropolitan areas of Indiana
County seats in Indiana
1815 establishments in Indiana Territory
Populated places established in 1815